The list of the coins included are for those issued by the Royal Dutch Mint from 1970 to 2001

10 Gulden
 1970 .720 silver 38 mm. 25th year of the end of the Second World War and liberation, 1945–1970
 1973 .720 silver 38 mm. 25th year of reign, Queen Juliana, 1948–1973
 1994 .925 silver 33 mm. 50th anniversary of the BE NE LUX trade accord, 1944–1994
 1995 .925 silver 33 mm. 350th anniversary, death of Hugo the Great, 1583–1645
 1996 .925 silver 33 mm. Jan Steen
 1997 .925 silver 33 mm. 50th anniversary of the Marshall plan and reconstruction

50 Gulden
 1982 .925 silver 38 mm. 200th anniversary, Dutch - American friendship
 1984 .925 silver 38 mm. William of Orange
 1987 .925 silver 38 mm. 50th wedding anniversary, Princess (Queen) Juliana & Prince Bernhard
 1989 .925 silver 38 mm. 300th anniversary, crowning of William of Orange and Mary of England
 1990 .925 silver 38 mm. 100 years of Queens Regnant in the Netherlands
 1991 .925 silver 38 mm. 25th Wedding Anniversary of Queen Beatrix & Prince Claus
 1994 .925 silver 38 mm. Ratification of Maastricht Treaty
 1995 .925 silver 38 mm. 50th Anniv. Liberation W.W.II
 1998 .925 silver 38 mm. 350th Anniv. Peace of Munster 1648-1998

References 
2008. source MAA - LBMRC

Economy of the Netherlands
Netherlands